Girod may refer to:

Geography
 Girod, Germany
 Saint-Girod, French commune in Savoie
 Girod Street Cemetery, New Orleans
 Girodpuri, a village in Chhattisgarh, India; formerly known as Girod

People 
 Girod Jackson III (1972) Democratic politician in Louisiana 
 Fred Girod (1951) Republican politician from Oregon
 Jean-François-Xavier Girod (1735–1783), French doctor
 Nicolas Girod, (1747–1840) mayor of New Orleans
 Family Girod de l'Ain:
 Jean-Louis Girod de l'Ain (1753–1839) French politician
 Amédée Girod de l'Ain (1781–1847) French politician
 Bertrand Girod de l'Ain (1929–), French journalist
 Alix Girod de l'Ain (1965–), French journalist
 Louis Girod (1799–1866), French politician
 Louis Girod (1856-1922), French député for Seine-et-Marne 1902–1906
 Baron Louis Girod de Montfalcon (1813–1880), Savoy politician
 Paul Girod (industriel) (1881–1951), industrial, founder of Ugine steelworks
 Marie-Louise Girod (1915–), French organist 
 Paul Girod (1931–), French politician
 Francis Girod (1944–2006), French film director
 Bastien Girod (1980–), Swiss politician
 Marie-Catherine Girod, French pianist
 Justin Girod-Chantrans, French army officer, naturalist and politician
 Lucas Chevalier-Girod, French ski jumper
 Thomas Girod (1983–), French luger
 Marie-Claire Girod, Buzy (singer) (1957)
 P. Girod (first name unknown) tennis player from France, singles winner of the French tennis championships at Roland Garros in 1901
 Géraldine Girod (1970-), French curler